Rob Justin Hulls  (born 23 January 1957) is a former Australian politician who was a member of the Victorian Legislative Assembly from 1996 to 2012, representing the electorate of Niddrie. As well as serving as the Deputy Premier of Victoria, he held the posts of state attorney-general and Minister for Racing.

During his tenure as Attorney-General of Victoria, Hulls was credited for revolutionising Victoria's justice system, with his reform agenda reshaping the state's criminal justice system into one widely recognised as the nation's most progressive.

Biography
Rob Hulls was born in Melbourne as one of seven children. He was privately educated at Xavier College from 1969–72 and then moved to the private Peninsula School from 1973–75. Upon leaving school Hulls worked as a law clerk for his father, Francis Charles Hulls, who owned the firm Frank C. Hulls & Co, in La Trobe Street, Melbourne. He completed the Articled Clerk's Course at the Royal Melbourne Institute of Technology in 1982, was Admitted as Barrister and Solicitor of the Supreme Court of Victoria on 1 March 1983 and was admitted as Solicitor at the Supreme Court of Queensland in 1986.

Hulls served as a Solicitor for the Legal Aid Commission of Victoria from 1984–86, and then worked for the West Queensland Aboriginal Legal Service for 5 years, and served as the Principal of Rob Hulls & Associates in Mt Isa from 1986-1990.

In addition to his legal career, prior to entering the Australian federal parliament, Hulls had served as an alderman at the Mt Isa City Council from 1988-1990, and had also served as a bar attendant, a grapepicker and as a labourer.

Hulls was appointed a Member of the Order of Australia for "significant service to the people and Parliament of Victoria, and to the law" in the 2021 Queen's Birthday Honours.

Political career

Federal Parliament
Rob Hulls served one term in Federal Parliament from 1990–93 as the member for Kennedy, Queensland.  He succeeded the long-standing National Party member Bob Katter Sr., who had retired from politics (he died just prior to the election).

In 1993, he was defeated by Bob Katter, the former member's son, who had been a minister in the Bjelke-Petersen, Ahern and Cooper ministries at state level in Queensland.  The race was very close throughout, and was only decided on the eighth count when a Liberal candidate's preferences flowed overwhelmingly to Katter.

Parliament of Victoria
Rob Hulls left Queensland soon after the losing his Federal Parliament seat, and in 1994 on returning to Melbourne was appointed Chief of Staff to the Victorian Opposition Leader, Jim Kennan, former attorney-general, who resigned from State Parliament shortly afterwards. Rob Hulls stayed on as Chief of Staff under Kennan's replacement John Brumby, who was Premier from 2007–2010. Following his election to the State Parliament, in the lower-house seat of Niddrie, Rob Hulls' replacement as Brumby's Chief of Staff was Julia Gillard, who later in her own career became Australia's first female prime minister (2010–13).

During his time in opposition, Hulls served as Shadow Minister Assisting the Leader on Scrutiny of Government (4 April 1996 – 13 January 1997), Shadow Attorney-General (4 April 1996 – 20 October 1999), Shadow Minister for Gaming (4 April 1996 – 1 October 1999), Shadow Minister for Tourism (13 January 1997 – 24 February 1999), Shadow Minister for WorkCover (24 February 1999 – 1 October 1999), Shadow Minister for Manufacturing Industry (1 October 1999 – 20 October 1999) and Shadow Minister for Racing (1 October 1999 – 20 October 1999). Throughout his state political career, Hulls held the offices of Attorney-General of Victoria; Minister for Manufacturing Industry and Minister for Racing from 1999–2002; Minister for WorkCover from 2002–2005; Minister for Planning January 2005 – December 2006; Minister for Racing from December 2006 – November 2010 and Minister for Industrial Relations from December 2002 – November 2010.

As attorney-general, Rob Hulls instigated significant and lasting changes to Victoria's legal system which saw Victoria become a national leader in progressive social justice reform, such as removing barriers to accessing assisted reproductive technology and abolishing laws that discriminated against people in same-sex relationships; many of Hulls' reforms have become an accepted and valued part of the state’s mainstream justice and social welfare systems and have influenced other jurisdictions to follow suit. Hulls oversaw the establishment of the state's first Charter of Human Rights and reform to Victoria's Upper House. He established special courts for Victoria's indigenous community, for people with mental health issues (Assessment and Referral Court), for people with drug addiction (Drug Court) and for victims of family violence (Family Violence specialist list), as well as creating Australia’s first and only Neighbourhood Justice Centre. Additionally, he introduced an open tender process for applicants to Victoria's judiciary to ensure that more women and people from diverse backgrounds were appointed. He appointed Australia’s first female Chief Justice of any superior court by appointing Marilyn Warren as Chief Justice of Victoria in 2003, as well as appointing a significant number of women to both the Magistrates Court and the County Court.

In May 2008, Hulls sought and obtained the first posthumous pardon in Victoria's legal history and the only instance of a pardon for a judicially executed person in Australia to date, when he sought and obtained a pardon for Colin Campbell Ross, who was found to have been wrongfully executed for the murder of a young girl in 1922.

He was unsuccessful in a campaign to defrock the legal profession and ban the wearing of wigs in courts, a move that was actively opposed by the Victorian Bar Association. Rob Hulls was quoted as saying that "members of the legal profession could continue to wear wigs in the privacy of their homes if they so wished but the wearing of wigs by the legal profession in the 21st century was outdated and elitist".

He was appointed as deputy premier to John Brumby on 30 July 2007 after the retirement of John Thwaites, and retained the position as attorney-general until his party's defeat at the election on 27 November 2010. He subsequently served as Deputy Opposition Leader and as Labor's education spokesman.

In 2011, Hulls suffered from the life-threatening condition epiglottitis which caused his airway to block; this led to him being placed in an induced coma for five days. On 27 January 2012, Hulls announced he was resigning from parliament. This triggered a by-election in the seat of Niddrie.

Personal life
A very keen supporter of the Geelong Football Club, Hulls married twice and has four children.

In October 2012, Hulls was appointed Adjunct Professor at RMIT and was invited to establish the new Centre for Innovative Justice as its inaugural Director. The Centre’s objective is to develop, drive, and expand the capacity of the justice system.

References

External links
Victorian Labor Party website, Biography of Rob Hulls, Retrieved 30 November 2010.
 

1957 births
Living people
Members of the Victorian Legislative Assembly
Members of the Australian House of Representatives for Kennedy
Members of the Australian House of Representatives
Deputy Premiers of Victoria
Attorneys-General of Victoria
Australian Labor Party members of the Parliament of Australia
Members of the Order of Australia
Australian solicitors
RMIT University alumni
Academic staff of RMIT University
People educated at Xavier College
Australian Labor Party members of the Parliament of Victoria
21st-century Australian politicians
20th-century Australian politicians
Politicians from Melbourne